E. Ann Hoggarth  (born ) is a former politician in Ontario, Canada. She was a Liberal member of the Legislative Assembly of Ontario from 2014 to 2018 who represented the riding of Barrie.

Background
Hoggarth was born and raised in Barrie, Ontario. She was an elementary school teacher at Allandale Heights Public School and Terry Fox Elementary School both in Barrie, and a past president of the Simcoe County Elementary Teachers' Federation.

Ann is the former president of the Barrie Skating Club, a position she held for 7 years. Working alongside Doug Leigh and city council, the Mariposa School of Skating was moved to its new home at the Allandale Recreation Centre. Ann was also involved in the community discussions that resulted in the successful completion of the Barrie Molson Centre.

Ann was awarded the Queen's Jubilee Award in 2003 for her hard work and dedication in the community and the education sector.

Politics
Hoggarth ran in the June 2014 provincial election as the Liberal candidate in the riding of Barrie. She defeated Progressive Conservative incumbent Rod Jackson by 2,248 votes. In the 2018 election, she was defeated by PC candidate Andrea Khanjin in the new riding of Barrie—Innisfil.

She served as the Chair of the Standing Committee on Finance & Economic Affairs and was the Parliamentary Assistant to the Ministry of Community and Social Services.

Election results

References

External links

1950 births
21st-century Canadian politicians
21st-century Canadian women politicians
Canadian schoolteachers
Living people
Ontario Liberal Party MPPs
People from Barrie
Women MPPs in Ontario